Saburo Iwasaki (11 October 1904 – 10 November 1982) was a Japanese cross-country skier. He competed in the men's 18 kilometre event at the 1932 Winter Olympics. From 1956 to 1960, Iwasaki was the managing director of the Ski Association of Japan, and later became the vice-chair of the organisation.

References

External links
 

1904 births
1982 deaths
Japanese male cross-country skiers
Olympic cross-country skiers of Japan
Cross-country skiers at the 1932 Winter Olympics
Sportspeople from Niigata Prefecture
20th-century Japanese people